Death to the French is a 1932 novel of the Peninsular War during the Napoleonic Wars, written by C. S. Forester, the author of the Horatio Hornblower novels. It was also published in the United States under the title Rifleman Dodd.

Overview

The novel relates the adventures of a British rifleman of the 95th Regiment of Foot who is cut off from his regiment when the Allied army retreats behind the Lines of Torres Vedras. He is forced to survive for several months in territory that has been devastated by the Allies and occupied by the French. With some help from a few local Portuguese, Dodd wages guerrilla warfare against the French. The story is told from both the perspective of Dodd and the Frenchmen he is fighting. Its picture of the hero's resolution and devotion to duty in dangerous circumstances caused it to be put on the official reading list endorsed by the Commandant of the United States Marine Corps.

Plot summary

The hero is Matthew Dodd, a rifleman in the 95th Regiment of Foot of the British Army. The novel takes place in Portugal early in the Peninsular War. The British had sent a small force of about 10,000 men to the aid of her ally, Portugal. Rather than face the overwhelming numbers of the opposing French forces under Marshal André Masséna, the British commander, Lord Wellington, secretly constructed the Lines of Torres Vedras and withdrew behind them, leaving the French force no options but to lay siege to the lines, or retreat. For three months the French encamped outside the lines, waiting for reinforcements from the other side of the Tagus River, but in the end hunger and disease forced them to retreat.

During the British withdrawal, Dodd becomes separated from his regiment and is cut off from the British forces, with the entire French army between him and the lines at Torres Vedras. In an attempt to get around the French, he heads for the Tagus River, hoping to follow it to Lisbon. However, the French are there ahead of him, and he has no option but to live off the land and try to survive. He joins a group of Portuguese guerrillas and spends two months with them, harassing the encamped French army, killing sentries and laying ambushes for scouting parties and supply animals.

After two months of guerrilla fighting, Dodd hears artillery fire from about ten miles away. He can tell by the sound that it is neither a battle nor a siege. He knows that anyone exchanging artillery fire with the French is an ally of his, so he takes his friend Bernardino and sets out to see what is happening. They meet another Portuguese guerrilla, whose name they never learn, who leads them to the site of the firing. There he sees British soldiers on the other side of the Tagus firing rockets at the town of Santarém, and the French returning cannon fire to stop them. Dodd deduces that there must be something in the town that the British want to set on fire; furthermore, it must be something near the river. From this he can guess what the target must be: the French are trying to construct a pontoon bridge across the Tagus, and the British are firing the rockets to try to burn the pontoon boats, rope, timber, and paint that are warehoused by the river.

Unable to dislodge the British rocketeers from their entrenchments on the far side of the river, the French gather up all the bridge-building supplies and move them farther up the river, to a position where the British can neither see them nor fire on them. Dodd determines to destroy the bridge material himself. He, Bernardino, and the unnamed guerrilla return to their band's headquarters, only to find that while they were gone the French had discovered and destroyed the whole band, hanging the men on trees and taking away the women and the food.

The three have nothing to eat, so the unnamed guerrilla visits the French encampment that night, kills a sentry and steals a pack mule. They slaughter the mule and smoke the meat, giving them enough food in their packs for several weeks. Then they set out to find the new bridge-building headquarters. Before they find it, they are surprised by a French patrol; they run for cover, but Dodd's two friends fall and are captured. From the safety of the rocks, Dodd looks back to see his friends hanged. He resolutely goes on alone and finds the French encampment. He patiently hides in the rocks watching the business of the camp for several days. Finally, he goes in by night, kills two sentries, and spreads highly flammable grease and oil (kept in cauldrons by the French for tarring rope, greasing cordage, and waterproofing their boats) over the pontoons and timber and rope, and sets it all on fire. From his hideout in the rocks, he sees the whole encampment burn, and is pleased with his success; he never learns that orders had arrived only that day for the French to burn the encampment themselves since Masséna had ordered a retreat.

Dodd avoids the retreating French army and happily rejoins his regiment, unacknowledged, unthanked and unconcerned about his months of demanding effort.  Dodd does, however, get something that to him is more important; a new uniform, new boots, a shave, and his first ration of bread & salt in months.

Homages

In Sharpe's Escape (2004), one of Bernard Cornwell's Richard Sharpe novels (which were partly inspired by Death to the French), a Rifleman named Matthew Dodd is separated from Sharpe's company in a skirmish during the Peninsular Campaign in 1810. Cornwell has acknowledged on his website that this character is intended to be the same individual depicted by Forester in Death to the French.

References

External links
 

1932 British novels
Historical novels
Novels set during the Napoleonic Wars
Novels by C. S. Forester
Rifle Brigade (Prince Consort's Own)
The Bodley Head books
Cultural depictions of Arthur Wellesley, 1st Duke of Wellington